HMS Orchis was a  that served in the Royal Navy during World War II.

North Atlantic trade convoy escort
Orchis was assigned first to the 4th Escort Group based at Greenock and then to Escort Group B3 of the Mid-Ocean Escort Force through early 1944. Orchis escorted convoy ONS 18 during the battle around this and ON 202.

English Channel
U-741 torpedoed LST-404 of convoy FTM-69 while Orchis was escorting nearby convoy FTC-68. Orchis gained and held sonar contact on U-741 and flooded the forward part of the U-boat with two Hedgehog attacks and two depth charge attacks. One person escaped from the aft torpedo-room hatch of the sunken U-boat, and was rescued by Orchis.

On 21 August 1944, Orchis struck a mine that destroyed the bow back to the 4-inch gun.  The damaged ship was beached on Juno Beach and declared a total loss.

Notes

References
 
 
 

 

Flower-class corvettes of the Royal Navy
Ships sunk by mines
1940 ships
Ships built by Harland and Wolff
Maritime incidents in August 1944